

Events

January events 
 January 18 – Construction on The Ghan route south of Port Augusta, Australia, begins.

February events 
 February 5 – The first train is operated on the Seattle and Walla Walla Railroad from Renton to Newcastle.

May events 
 May 9 – The final segment of the Romanian railway between Vârciorova in the south and Roman in the north opens.
 May – Chemins de fer de l'État formed in France to take over ten small railway companies operating between the Loire and Garonne.

June events 
 June 1 – The North British Railway's Tay Bridge across the Firth of Tay in Scotland, is opened to public traffic, making it the longest in the world at that date.

July events 
 July 2 – The Brooklyn, Flatbush & Coney Island Railway, original predecessor of the BMT Brighton Line, in modern Brooklyn, New York, opens to Brighton Beach on Coney Island.

August events
 August 24 – The narrow gauge Ballymena and Larne Railway starts passenger operations in County Antrim, the first on the Irish 3 ft narrow gauge.

October events
 October 16 – Rimutaka Incline in New Zealand opens.

December events
 December 4 – The first Shay locomotive is completed for the 3-foot narrow gauge Alleyton and Big Lake Railroad of Everett Township, Michigan.

Unknown date events
 Fred Harvey enters a partnership with the Atchison, Topeka and Santa Fe Railway to build and operate the Harvey House chain of restaurants and hotels that will serve the railroad's passengers.
 The Richmond and Danville Railroad acquires the Charlotte, Columbia and Augusta Railroad.
 The Canadian Engine and Machinery Company is reorganized after a bankruptcy as the Canadian Locomotive and Engine Company.
 The Wilmington, Columbia and Augusta Railroad, lessee of the Wilmington and Weldon Railroad, declares bankruptcy.

Births

March births
 March 2 – William Kissam Vanderbilt II, heir to Cornelius Vanderbilt and president of the New York Central system (d. 1944).

April births
 April 14 – Angus Daniel McDonald, president of the Southern Pacific Company, parent company of the Southern Pacific Railroad, 1932–1941 (d. 1941).

Deaths

March deaths
 March 29 – Mark Hopkins, a member of The Big Four group of financiers in California (b. 1813).

June deaths 
 June 27 – Sidney Breese, U.S. senator from Illinois known as the "father of the Illinois Central Railroad," dies (b. 1800).

October deaths 
 October 19 – Benjamin Henry Latrobe, II, designer of Baltimore and Ohio Railroad's Thomas Viaduct (still in use today), dies (b. 1806).

December deaths 
 December 27 – Daniel McCallum, General Superintendent of New York and Erie Railroad 1855–1858 (b. 1815).

References